is a town located in Nakaniikawa District, Toyama Prefecture, Japan. , the town had an estimated population of 20,827 in 7958 households  and a population density of 88 persons per km².

Geography
Kamiichi is located in east-central Toyama Prefecture, approximately 15 kilometers to the east of the capital of Toyama city. Most of the town is very mountainous, with peaks rising to almost 3000 meters in the southeast. The 2999 meter Mount Tsurugi is located in Kamiichi.

Surrounding municipalities
Toyama Prefecture
 Toyama
 Namerikawa
 Uozu
 Kurobe

Climate
The town has a Humid subtropical climate (Köppen Cfa) characterized by hot summers and cold winters with heavy snowfall. The average annual temperature in Kamiichi is 13.8 °C. The average annual rainfall is 2243 mm with September as the wettest month. The temperatures are highest on average in August, at around 26.4 °C, and lowest in January, at around 2.4 °C.

Demographics
Per Japanese census data, the population of Kamiichi has decreased slightly over the past 40 years.

History
The area of present-day Kamiichi was part of ancient Etchū Province. The town of Kamiichi was created with the establishment of the municipalities system on April 1, 1889.

Education
Kamiichi has six public elementary schools and one public middle school operated by the town government, and one public high school operated by the Toyama Prefectural Board of Education.

Transportation

Railway
  Toyama Chihō Railway Main Line
  -  -  -

Highway

Local attractions
Ōiwa-san Nisseki-ji, Buddhist temple with Nara period bas-relief carvings; a National Historic Site
Kamiichi Kurokawa Sites, a number of archaeological sites with Heian to Kamakura period ruins registered as a National Historic Site.
A traditional Japanese house that was used as a model for the house in the film Wolf Children (directed by Kamiichi native Mamoru Hosoda).

In popular culture 
Much of the 2012 film Wolf Children is set in Kamiichi.

Notable people from Kamiichi
Mamoru Hosoda, director

References

External links

  

 
Towns in Toyama Prefecture